At the BBC is a collection of English punk rock band Sham 69 tracks that were performed in session at the BBC and was released in 2003. Tracks 1 to 5 recorded for John Peel at the Maida Vale Studios, London 28 November 1977 and first transmitted on 6 December 1977. Other tracks were recorded in concert at the Paris Theatre, London on 21 February 1979.

Track listing 
"Borstal Breakout" - 2:09
"Hey Little Rich Boy" - 1:45
"They Don't Understand" - 1:52
"Rip Off" - 1:40
"What Have We Got?" - 1:54
"Everybody's Innocent" - 2:25
"Angels with Dirty Faces" - 2:32
"Anyway Who Gives a Damn?" - 3:30
"That's Life" - 2:20
"Day Tripper" - 3:33
"Questions and Answers" - 3:32
"If the Kids Are United" - 4:14

References 

Sham 69 compilation albums
Sham 69 live albums
Peel Sessions recordings
2003 live albums
2003 compilation albums
Albums produced by Tony Wilson
Strange Fruit Records live albums
Strange Fruit Records compilation albums
BBC Radio recordings